Ligilactobacillus acidipiscis is a species in the genus Ligilactobacillus. It is a homofermentative, rod-shaped lactic acid bacteria. Its type strain is FS60-1T.

References

Further reading
Ljungh, Åsa, and Torkel Wadström, eds. Lactobacillus molecular biology: from genomics to probiotics. Horizon Scientific Press, 2009.

External links

LPSN
Type strain of Lactobacillus acidipiscis at BacDive -  the Bacterial Diversity Metadatabase

Lactobacillaceae
Bacteria described in 2000